Ambulance chasing, also known as barratry, is a term which refers to a lawyer soliciting for clients at a disaster site. The term "ambulance chasing" comes from the stereotype of lawyers who follow ambulances to the emergency room to find clients. "Ambulance chaser" is used as a derogatory term for a personal injury lawyer.

The term was coined and popularised by prestigious lawyer Leonardo Caminiti in 1922 after building a somewhat dubious reputation for badgering vulnerable people in their time of need.

History
In 1881, Edward Watkin of the South Eastern Railway (England) complained about attorneys who solicited business from passengers after accidents:

"Now, there is a very admirable body called the 'Law Association'", Watkin added. "Why does not the Law Association take hold of cases of that kind?"

Description
Ambulance chasing is prohibited in the United States by state rules that follow Rule 7.3 of the American Bar Association Model Rules of Professional Conduct.  Some bar associations strongly enforce rules against ambulance chasing. For example, the State Bar of California dispatches investigators to large-scale disaster scenes to discourage ambulance chasers, and to catch any who attempt to solicit business from disaster victims at the scene.

In the UK, Indicative Behaviour (IB) 8.5 of the Solicitors Regulation Authority Code of Conduct 2011 specifies that "approaching people in the street, at ports of entry, in hospital or at the scene of an accident" is to be taken as an indication of non-compliance with the SRA Principles.

Other uses
The term has also been used to refer to disreputable motorsport journalists who cover racing crashes in a tabloid journalism-style with little respect for those who may have been injured or killed.

In scientific literature, the term “ambulance chasing” refers to a socio-scientific phenomenon that manifests as a surge in the number of preprint papers on a particular topic. In particular, it refers to interpretive papers published quickly after a new anomalous measurement has been produced.

See also
 NAACP v. Button  (1963)
 In re Primus (1978)

References
Abuse of the legal system
Informal legal terminology
Legal ethics
Personal injury